The Last Outpost is a 1951 American Technicolor Western film directed by Lewis R. Foster, set in the American Civil War with brothers on opposite sides. The film is character actor Burt Mustin's film debut at the age of 67.

The film earned an estimated $1,225,000 at the US box office in 1951.  The Last Outpost had the distinction of being the most successful film for the prolific B movie company, Pine-Thomas Productions. The film was re-released in 1962 by Citation Films Inc. under the title Cavalry Charge.

Plot
In 1862, Confederate Army Captain Vance Britton (Reagan) and his cavalry force are capturing most of the supplies sent east along the Santa Fe Trail before they reach the Union Army outpost at San Gil, Arizona, where trading post owner Sam McQuade (Ridgely) deals with the Apache Indians. Union Colonel Jeb Britton (Bennett), Vance's brother, is sent West to stop the Confederate raids, unaware that his brother is his adversary. When he arrives with only a small detachment of troops, McQuade tries to persuade Jeb to use the Apaches to subdue the Rebels, but Jeb rejects the idea, certain the Indians would kill settlers as well as Confederate soldiers.

That evening McQuade, believing that Jeb rather than Vance is the Britton who was once the fiancé of McQuade's lonely and unhappy wife Julie (Fleming), tries to embarrass them both socially. McQuade angrily tells Julie that she is still pining for Vance and she leaves him. Vance turns the tables on Jeb’s attempt to trap the Rebels and humiliates him. Returning to the fort on foot and bootless, Jeb is informed by McQuade that he has persuaded the government to negotiate with the Apaches. Soon afterwards McQuade is attacked and killed by Apaches. Vance finds a letter on McQuade's body stating that a Union officer is on his way from Washington, D.C. to parley with the Apache chiefs. Vance waylays the officer and takes his place, discovering that Chief Grey Cloud is actually a disgraced former Army general who married an Apache. Gray Cloud knows the real emissary and Britton admits that he is a Confederate officer trying to keep the Apaches out of the war.

A group of Apaches is arrested for McQuade's murder. Gray Cloud gives Vance 24 hours to free the prisoners as the price of keeping the Apaches from joining forces with the Union troops. Still posing as a Yankee officer, Vance goes to the jail in San Gil, where the jailed Apaches tell him that McQuade was killed for selling them defective guns and tainted liquor. He encounters Julie, who angrily rejects his explanation that he jilted her because he chose the Confederacy. Before Vance can arrange the escape of the prisoners or seize a shipment of gold coin being sent east by stagecoach, Jeb returns from searching for the Rebels and captures his brother. Vance escapes and reluctantly decides to return to Texas.

Grey Cloud, under a flag of truce, comes to San Gil with his warriors and promises to stay out of the white man’s war if the prisoners are released, but is killed by a civilian. Vance and his command learn of the ensuing Apache attack, and he orders his men to charge the Apaches and save the town. After the battle, Julie returns to the East, promising to reunite with Vance someday. The brothers shake hands before the Confederates ride away.

Cast
 Ronald Reagan as Capt. Vance Britton
 Rhonda Fleming as Julie McQuade
 Bruce Bennett as Colonel Jeb Britton
 Bill Williams as Seargent Tucker
 Noah Beery Jr. as Seargent Calhoun
 Hugh Beaumont as Lieutnant Fenton
 Peter Hansen as Lieutnant Crosby
 Lloyd Corrigan as Mr. Delacourt
 John Ridgely as Sam McQuade
 Burt Mustin as Marshal (uncredited)

References

External links
 
 

1951 films
American Civil War films
Films adapted into comics
Films directed by Lewis R. Foster
Films set in 1862
American Western (genre) films
1951 Western (genre) films
1950s English-language films
1950s American films